Royal tiger may refer to:
 Bengal tiger
 the Nazi-German tank King Tiger, see Tiger II